Bteghrine (also spelled Bteghrin and Btighrin) is a municipality in the Matn District of the Mount Lebanon Governorate of Lebanon.

Etymology 
The exact origin of the town name Bteghrine is unknown, but possibilities include Place of Warriors, Place of Rocks, and House of the Saddest - references to a large battle in the area around 1290 that resulted in thousands of deaths. This date corresponds closely with the rise of the Mamluks, a period which saw numerous battles in the area, including a 1291 rebellion by the Shi'a against the new rulers in Keserwan, the district on the northern border of the Matn.

Geography 
It is bordered by Mount Sannine to the east, Wadi el-Jamajem to the north, Jouar to the west, and Khenchara to the south. The municipality is composed of seven neighborhoods and four outlying areas.

Neighborhoods 
 Haret al-Ain
 Haret al-Dara
 Haret al-Shahara
 Haret al-Shawyee
 Haret al-Ssaha
 Haret al-Wata
 Haret Ali
 Haret al-Asfourieh

Outlying areas 

 Bsefrine
 Meisree
 Sabourta
 Zaarour

Water 
There are several springs used for both drinking water and agricultural purposes in Bteghrine. The four primary springs are Zaarour, Manboukh, Mir, and Sparta.

Agriculture 
Bteghrine is situated on a rocky hillside, but supports a thriving, self-sufficient agriculture. Most of the land within the city and the surrounding hills, including the Meisree and Bsefrine districts, was fully-terraced to make it more suited for planting.  The most common fruits and vegetables grown in Bteghrine are: figs, grapes, mulberry, plums, apples, peaches, persimmon, pomegranate, cherries, tomatoes, cucumber, parsley, mint, wheat, and beans. Small shops in the town process much of the local produce into arak, molasses, wine, and preserves.

Economy 

The Saliba Nail and Screw factory is the largest single plant in Bteghrine.  Additionally, the town has a large number of small shops for blacksmithing, woodworking, car repair and bodywork, leather tailoring, and aluminum manufacturing.  The city also enjoys a full set of services including three gas stations, a supermarket, dry cleaner, several specialty and general stores, a large bakery, several bookstores, several clinics, many restaurants, and one hotel.  Bteghrine also hosts the central telephone station for the upper Metn region.

Education 
There is one public school in the town named Bteghrine Public School, and one private Catholic school.

Religion 
The vast majority of inhabitants of Bteghrine are Christians, with roughly 80% Greek Orthodox and 20% Melkite Catholic.

Churches 
 St. George – Greek Orthodox.
 St. Michael – Greek Orthodox.
 St. Elias – Greek Orthodox.
 Notre Dame – Melkite Catholic.

Famous Bteghrineites 
 Antonious Saliba – Orthodox priest in the 19th century who has had miracles attributed to him. Currently in process for sainthood.
 Elias Murr – Lebanese deputy prime minister and defense minister
 George Hawi – former secretary general of the Lebanese Communist Party, assassinated June 21, 2005 by a bomb planted under his car
 Greg Simon (Saliba) – current president of the Washington, D.C.-based think tank FasterCures, chief domestic policy advisor to former vice president Al Gore from 1993 to 1997
 Michel Murr – former Lebanese minister of the interior
 Naseeb M. Saliba – co-founder of the Tutor-Saliba Corporation, one of the largest construction companies in the United States. Responsible for the construction of LAX, SFO, The Olympic Stadium in Los Angeles, among many others major United States landmarks.
 George Elie Nassar El Murr – One of the first Lebanese assented in America..
 George A. Saliba – CTO of multibillion-dollar Quantum Corp. Currently has over 100 patents (published or in process) and is internationally recognized as an industry pioneer and inventor in data storage.
 Gabriel Murr – former Lebanese minister of the interior (July 26, 1948 – October 10, 1949)
 Gabriel Elias El Murr - founder of the first radio station in Mount Lebanon and founder/owner of MTV Lebanon, former deputy and politician.

References

External links 
Bteghrine, Localiban 
 Bteghrine.com
 Lebanese Government Portal for Information & Forms - Municipality of Bteghrine
 Tutorsaliba.com

Populated places in the Matn District
Tourist attractions in Lebanon
Eastern Orthodox Christian communities in Lebanon
Melkite Christian communities in Lebanon